Duridanov Peak is the sharp rocky peak in Ellsworth Mountains, Antarctica rising to 2453 m on the side ridge that trends 9.15 km from Mount Dalrymple on the main crest of northern Sentinel Range east-northeastwards to Robinson Pass.  It surmounts Sabazios Glacier to the north.

The peak is named after the Bulgarian linguist Ivan Duridanov (1920-2005).

Location
US mapping in 1961.

See also
 Mountains in Antarctica

Maps
 Newcomer Glacier.  Scale 1:250 000 topographic map.  Reston, Virginia: US Geological Survey, 1961.
 Antarctic Digital Database (ADD). Scale 1:250000 topographic map of Antarctica. Scientific Committee on Antarctic Research (SCAR). Since 1993, regularly updated.

Notes

References
 Duridanov Peak. SCAR Composite Gazetteer of Antarctica.
 Bulgarian Antarctic Gazetteer. Antarctic Place-names Commission. (details in Bulgarian, basic data in English)

External links
 Duridanov Peak. Copernix satellite image

Ellsworth Mountains
Bulgaria and the Antarctic
Mountains of Ellsworth Land